Álvaro Santos Fortes Inácio (born 28 September 1935) is a former Portuguese professional footballer.

Career statistics

Club

Notes

References

External links

1935 births
Living people
Portuguese footballers
Portugal youth international footballers
Association football midfielders
Primeira Liga players
Segunda Divisão players
C.F. Os Belenenses players
Atlético Clube de Portugal players
S.L. Benfica footballers
S.C. Olhanense players
Vitória S.C. players
Footballers from Lisbon